Histone-lysine N-methyltransferase EZH1 is an enzyme that in humans is encoded by the EZH1 gene.

Function
In mice, EZH1 and EZH2 cogovern histone H3K27 trimethylation and are essential for hair follicle homeostasis and wound repair. EZH1 also complements EZH2 in maintaining stem cell identity and executing pluripotency.

References

Further reading